"The Mystery of Marie Rogêt", often subtitled A Sequel to "The Murders in the Rue Morgue", is a short story by American writer Edgar Allan Poe written in 1842. This is the first murder mystery based on the details of a real crime. It first appeared in Snowden's Ladies' Companion in three installments, November and December 1842 and February 1843. Poe referred to it as one of his "tales of ratiocination".

Plot summary

Poe's detective character C. Auguste Dupin and his assistant, the unnamed narrator, undertake the unsolved murder of Marie Rogêt in Paris. The body of Rogêt, a perfume shop employee, is found in the Seine, and the press takes a keen interest in the mystery. Dupin remarks that the newspapers "create a sensation ... [rather] than to further the cause of truth". Even so, he uses the newspaper reports to get into the mind of the murderer.

Dupin rejects the popular theory blaming the murder on a gang of ruffians seen in the area around the time of Rogêt's disappearance. One of such a group, he reasons, would have certainly confessed to the crime due to fear of betrayal rather than a bothered conscience. 

Using the known facts in the case, Dupin further determines that a single murderer was involved. This person was probably a sailor, and dragged the victim by the cloth belt around her waist at first, then switched to a cloth around her neck, before dumping the body off a boat into the river. Finding the boat, Dupin suggests, will lead the police to the murderer. An "editor's note" states that it would be inappropriate to relate details of what followed, but that the police did apprehend the true murderer with the help of Dupin's deductions.

Origins
The narrative is based upon the actual murder of Mary Cecilia Rogers. Rogers was presumably born in Lyme, Connecticut, in 1820, though her birth records have not survived. She disappeared on October 4, 1838, in New York City. Working at a tobacco shop, she was regarded as attractive by the male clientele and thus became known as the "Beautiful Cigar Girl". Only a few days later the newspapers announced her return. It was said she had eloped with a naval officer. Three years later, on July 25, 1841, she disappeared again. Her body was found floating in the Hudson River on July 28 in Hoboken, New Jersey. The details surrounding the case suggested she was murdered. The death of this well-known woman received national attention for weeks. Months later, the inquest still ongoing, her fiancé was found dead, an act of suicide. By his side, a remorseful note and an empty bottle of poison were found.

Writing about Rogers as a sequel to "The Murders in the Rue Morgue", Poe tried to solve the aforementioned enigma by creating a murder mystery. As Poe wrote in a letter in 1842: "under the pretense of showing how Dupin ... unravelled the mystery of Marie's assassination, I, in fact, enter into a very rigorous analysis of the real tragedy in New York." He situated the narrative in Paris using the details of the original tragedy. Although there was intense media interest and immortalizing of a sort by Poe, the crime remains one of the most puzzling unsolved murders of New York City.

Fictionalizing actual events, especially murder, was common in this period in American literature. Poe had previously fictionalized the so-called Beauchamp–Sharp Tragedy in his only play, Politian, which was left uncompleted in 1835. The sensational murder story was also fictionalized by several other writers including William Gilmore Simms and Thomas Holley Chivers. "The Mystery of Marie Rogêt", however, was likely the first real-life crime turned into a detective story.

Publication history
Poe presented "The Mystery of Marie Rogêt" by telling editors he had solved the Mary Rogers murder at a time when most readers would know the details of that event. Anxious to get it published, he offered the story to George Roberts of the Boston Notion, writing on June 4, 1842, "For reasons, however, which I need not specify, I am desirous of having this tale printed in Boston." The same day, however, he offered the story to Joseph Evans Snodgrass of the Baltimore Saturday Visiter.

The first part of the serialized story finally appeared in Snowden's Ladies' Companion in November 1842, followed by the second part in December, published in New York by William W. Snowden. An article published in the November 26, 1842, issue of the New York Tribune caused Poe to delay publication of the third installment. The newspaper reported new evidence that suggested that Rogers, the real-life victim, may have died from a botched abortion attempt, referred to as a "premature delivery". He made minor changes in his story to make a similar suggestion. A full reprint of the story in 1845 included 15 small changes to suggest he had known this as a possibility from the start. The story still ends with a recommendation to investigate a possible elopement and the attempt to throw suspicion on a gang.

Critical response
Of Poe's three tales of ratiocination, "The Mystery of Marie Rogêt" is generally considered the least successful. A modern critic wrote:
It might better be called an essay than a story. As an essay, it is an able if tedious exercise in reasoning. As a story, it scarcely exists. It has no life-blood. The characters neither move nor speak.... Only a professional student of analytics or an inveterate devotee of criminology can read it with any degree of unfeigned interest.

Poe's literary rival Rufus Wilmot Griswold, however, voiced a high opinion of the story and considered it an example of Poe's cunning intellect. Charles Baudelaire considered this tale as "a masterpiece, a wonder".

Film adaptation

In 1942 Universal Pictures produced the gothic mystery film The Mystery of Marie Roget based on the Poe story. Directed by Phil Rosen, the film starred Patric Knowles, Maria Ouspenskaya and Maria Montez.

See also
	
C. Auguste Dupin 	
"The Murders in the Rue Morgue"
"The Purloined Letter"

References

Sources
 

External links

"All about Mary Rogers' Mysterious Murder" from The Crime Library.
Publication history at the Edgar Allan Poe Society
 (includes The Mystery of Marie Rogêt)
 

1842 short stories
Short stories by Edgar Allan Poe
Detective fiction short stories
Short stories set in Paris
Works originally published in American magazines
Works originally published in women's magazines
Short stories adapted into films